Sinan Erbil (born 11 January 1965) is an Iraqi Turkmen singer from Erbil. His latest album is the politally charged "Neden Ağlar Kerkük'üm?", featuring Nuray Hafiftas along with a host of world class musicians ıncludıng Erdinç Şenyaylar.

Early life
Sinan Erbil was born in Erbil, Iraq. He is fluent in the Iraqi Turkmen dialect (or "Iraqi Turkish"), Turkish (closely related to Iraqi Turkmen), Arabic and English. His father, was the owner of a popular coffee shop in Erbil. At the age of four, he began learning Turkish folk music from his mother. He would later go on to perform at his father's coffee shop whilst capturing the hearts of his father's customers. Although his parents encouraged his passion for music, they also were mindful in restricting him from spending all his time on it.

Career
In 1983, he received one year tuition from the Iran/Azerbaycan music academy. As a result of political unrest, he later migrated to from Iraq to Turkey, enlisting in a specialised bağlama (Turkish guitar) course & later on became involved in the Turkish music arts via Niğde. Later, he returned to Ankara and enlisted for another year in studying Turkish classical and folk music. In 1992 he performed in an Opera musical in Athens. In 1993 Sinan migrated to Sydney, where he became immediately involved with the Australian Turkmen & Turkish Association. To further strengthen his musical abilities, he joined the Sydney Turkish Arts Academy. Whilst there, he was taught by the world-renowned classical musician Sabahattin Akdağcık & starred in many performances that were put together by the academy which involved another well known classical musician, Kemal Toprak.

Albums
 Turkmen Ezgileri (1999)
 Samancı Kızı (2005)
 Neden Ağlar Kerkük'üm? (2008)

Singles
 Vatan (2007)

Web Sites
 Güzel Kerkük

1965 births
Living people
People from Erbil
Turkish folk musicians
Turkish people of Iraqi Turkmen descent
Azerbaijani-language singers
Turkish-language singers
Iraqi Turkmen people